Jun Miyake (Japanese: 三宅 純 Hepburn: Miyake Jun, January 7, 1958 in Kyoto) is a Japanese composer. His music (e.g., the songs "Lilies in the Valley" and "The Here and After") was used in the film Pina, nominated for the Academy Awards for Best Documentary Feature in January 2012. He has also been awarded by the German critic's award, Der Preis der deutschen Schallplattenkritik, as Best Album of the Year for his last three albums, "Stolen from Strangers", "Lost Memory Theatre act-1", and "Lost Memory Theatre act-2".

Discovered by Japanese jazz trumpeter Terumasa Hino, Miyake started his career as a jazz trumpet player, having studied at Berklee College of Music from 1976 to 1981. In 1981, he won the prize at the Massachusetts Artist Foundation award for his composition.

After returning to Tokyo, he became an influential artist, as well as a successful composer. Miyake has now released 27 solo albums, and has worked on films, documentaries, dances, advertisement, theatre pieces, and served as a producer for numerous artists. His main instruments include the trumpet, flugelhorn, melodica, piano, keyboard, fender rhodes, and programming.

In 1983, he released his first album "June Night Love", which includes two tracks used in the TDK TV commercial starring Andy Warhol. He then continued on to working for over 3000 TV commercials, which led to winning many awards including Cannes advertisement film festival and the Digital Media Grands prix.

Miyake has worked closely with Pina Bausch for pieces including Rough Cut (2005), Vollmond (2006), Sweet Mambo (2008), Como El Musguito En La Piedra, Ay Si Si... (2009), which led to the film Pina by Wim Wenders; his tracks were featured in the essential scenes. This film was awarded by European Film Award 2011 as Best Documentary; nominated for the Academy Awards 2012 as Best Documentary Feature,[4] and BAFTA 2012 as Best non-English language film. With Katsuhiro Otomo in 1995, he composed the soundtrack of the episode "Stink Bomb" for the anime Memories, where he uses a combination of jazz and funk to emphasize the film's chaotic and comedic nature.

He has also worked closely with Robert Wilson on White Town (2002), an homage to Arne Jacobsen at Bellevue Teatret in Copenhagen; Jean-Paul Goude who has done the artwork for Stolen from Strangers, Lost Memory Theatre act-1, Lost Memory Theatre act-2, Oliver Stone, and Philippe Decouflé, among others, as well as collaborations with artists such as Hal Willner, Arto Lindsay, Peter Scherer, Arthur H, Vinicius Cantuaria, Cosmic voice of Bulgaria, David Byrne, Grace Jones, Gavin Friday, Nina Hagen, Ron Carter, Michael Brecker, David Sanborn, Al Foster, Dhafer Youssef, Vincent Segal, Remi Kolpa Kopoul, Jean-Michel Jarre, and many others.

With his ability to blend the most seemingly disparate element of music, he has achieved much respect throughout the world. From 2005, he has set a base in Paris, actively working on several projects. He has been selected as "Man of 2009" by Galeries Lafayette Homme.

In 2016, he arranged the Japanese national anthem Kimigayo for 2016 Summer Olympics closing ceremony; composed the track "ANTHEM OUTRO" for the "ARIGATO FROM JAPAN" sequence.

Discography
1983 — JUNE NIGHT LOVE　(TDK RECORDS)
1984 — Especially Sexy　(TDK RECORDS)
1988 — TOKOSHIE no TENOHIRA　〈永遠乃掌 〉　(SWITCH RECORDS)
1989 — Cycloid / Stokesia　(FUNHOUSE) 
1989 - "Gorilla original soundtrack"  
1991 — ONE　(PONY CANYON)
1991 — Sublime&JUN MIYAKE / RECIENTE　(WEA MUSIC)
1991 — zans / La Party　(NIPPON COLUMBIA)
1993 — ENTROPATHY　〈星ノ玉ノ緒〉　(SONY RECORDS)
1996 — JUN MIYAKE CM TRACKS VOL.1　(SLC RECORDS)
1996 — JUN MIYAKE CM TRACKS VOL.2　(SLC RECORDS)
1996 — 常夏乃憂ヒ JUN MIYAKE LIVE at CAY '95　(SAIDERA RECORDS)
1997 — Latinism Reversible　(TOKUMA JAPAN COMMUNICATIONS)
1998 — "angels rondo" MUSIC for TAKAYUKI TERAKADO EXHIBITION　(TERAPIKA RECORDS)
1998 - "PuPu the soundtrack (Little More records)"
1999 — Glam Exotica !　(BEAMS RECORDS)
2000 — Mondo Erotica !　(BEAMS RECORDS)
2000 — Innocent Bossa in the mirror　(BEAMS RECORDS/CONSIPIO RECORDS)
2004 - "MASK DE 41 Original Soundtrack (Little More records)"
2006 - "Kiba Original Soundtrack vol.1(Aniplex)"
2007 — Stolen from strangers　(drApe/P-VINE, enja-yellowbird)
2007 - "Kiba Original Soundtrack vol.2(Aniplex)"
2009 — "The Miraculous Mandarin (Parco)"
2009 — "Vollmond music from the dance theater of Pina Bausch (VideoArts)"
2010 — "Jeanne d'arc Soundtrack (Pony Canyon)"
2010 — Sublime&JUN MIYAKE / LUDIC  (drApe/P-VINE, enja-yellowbird)
2011 — Pina by Wim Wenders Soundtrack  (Wenders Music)
2013 — Lost Memory Theatre act-1 (drApe/P-VINE, enja-yellowbird)
2014 — Woyzeck  (Pony Canyon)
2014 — 9 Days Queen  (Pony Canyon)
2014 — Lost Memory Theatre act-2 (drApe/P-VINE, enja-yellowbird)
2017 —  Last Picture - Dairo Miyamoto (drApe/P-VINE, enja-yellowbird)
2017 - "NORMAN: The Moderate Rise and Tragic Fall of a New York Fixer Original Soundtrack"
2018 — Lost Memory Theatre act-3 (drApe/P-VINE, enja-yellowbird)
2019 - "COLOMENA / Kyoko Katsunuma & Jun Miyake (drApe/P-VINE)
2019 - "An artist of floating world Original Soundtrack (drApe/P-VINE)
2019 - "No Longer Human Original Soundtrack (drApe/P-VINE)
2019 - 'Les Traducteurs Original Soundtrack (drApe/P-VINE)" 
2020 - Mémoires du Sapa Original Soundtrack (drApe/P-VINE)" 
2021 - "No.9 -Immortal Melody Soundtrack (e+ Music)"
2021 - "Sanson Original Soundtrack (drApe/P-VINE)" 
2021 — Whispered Garden (drApe/P-VINE, enja-yellowbird)
2022 - "Snow Country Original Soundtrack (drApe/P-VINE) "

Films
1987 — "Itoshi no Half Moon" - Yōjirō Takita
1995 — Stink Bomb - "Memories" - Katsuhiro Otomo
1998 — "The Story of Pupu" - Kensaku Watanabe
1999 — "Any Given Sunday" - Oliver Stone - Didn't come through the final cut
2004 — Mask de 41 - Taishi Muramoto
2005 — Coffee with Pina - Lee Yanor
2006 — L'Ombre et la Main - Laurence Garret
2006 - "Kiba"
2009 — Mourir d'Aimer - Josse Dayan
2010 — Katai - Claire Doyon
2010 — 3 femmes amoureuses - Pierre Daigniere
2010 — The Women - Diane English
2011 — Jonas - Christian Ulmen & Robert Wilde
2011 — Eat Pray Love - Ryan Murphy
2011 — Pina - Wim Wenders (Awarded for European Film Award 2011, Nominee for the Academy Awards 2012, BAFTA awards 2012)
2014 — Tiens-toi droite - Katia Lewkowicz
2016 — Norman: The Moderate Rise and Tragic Fall of a New York Fixer - Joseph Cedar
2019 — The Translators-{Regis Roinsard}
2019 - "An artist of floating world (Kazutaka Watanabe)}
2019 - "No Longer Human (Mika Ninagawa)}
2022 -"Snow Country (Kazutaka Watanabe)}

Theater Pieces
2000 — Philippe Decoufle / improvisational session / Palais de Chaillot
2002 — Robert Wilson / "Whitetown" / Bellevue Theatret (Copenhagen)
2002 — Philippe Decoufle / Iris workshop / Yokohama
2005 — Philippe Decoufle / Solo / Paris
2005 — Pina Bausch / Rough Cut / Wuppertal
2005 — Katrine Wiedman / The Mermaid / Copenhagen
2005 — Philippe Decoufle / Theatre Mogador/ Paris
2006 — Pina Bausch / Rough Cut / Wuppertal
2007 — Pina Bausch / Bamboo Blues / Wuppertal
2007 — Breht-Weil / The Threepenny Opera / Akira Shirai / Tokyo
2008 — Pina Bausch /Sweet Mambo / Wuppertal
2009 — Shuji Terayama / The Miraculous Mandarin / Akira Shirai / Tokyo
2010 — Philippe Ridley / Leaves of Glass / Akira Shirai / Tokyo
2010 — Kazuki Nakajima / Jeanne d'Arc / Akira Shirai / Tokyo
2011 — Paul Auster / Ghosts / Akira Shirai / Tokyo
2011 — Kyoka Izumi / Tenshu Monogatari / Akira Shirai / Tokyo
2012 — Georg Büchner / WOYZECK / Akira Shirai / Tokyo
2013 — Go Aoki / 9 Days Queen / Akira Shirai / Tokyo
2014 — Jun Miyake / Lost Memory Theatre / Akira Shirai / Yokohama
2015 — Pearl S. Buck / PEARL / Lincoln Center / New York (unfinished master has been used illegally)
2015 — No.9 Melody Immortality / Akira Shirai / Tokyo
2020 - Flying Sapa / Kumiko Ueda
2021 - Sanson / Akira Shirai

References

External links
 junmiyake.com – official website (in Japanese and English)
 Song "The Here and After", music: Jun Miyake; lyrics: Lisa Papineau.
 

1958 births
Japanese composers
Japanese jazz musicians
Japanese jazz trumpeters
Japanese male composers
Living people
Musicians from Kanagawa Prefecture
Tokuma Japan Communications artists
21st-century trumpeters
21st-century Japanese male musicians
Male jazz musicians
Berklee College of Music alumni